Cornsay Colliery is a village in County Durham, England.
 It is situated a few miles to the west of Durham, close to Cornsay, Quebec and Esh Winning.

Regarding Cornsay Colliery, the following is taken from History, Topography, and Directory of the County Palatine of Durham published by Francis Whellan & Company in 1894:

References

External links

Villages in County Durham